Pranathi is an Indian former model and actress. She appeared in a Malayalam-language film and won critical acclaim for her performance in the Tamil film Gambeeram (2004). She went on to appear in a few Tamil and Kannada -language films.

Personal life

Pranathi is born to Malayalam actor Jose and Ratnaprabha on 19 April 1987. She is married to Dr.Sivarajan in September 2011

Career
Pranathi began her career as a model. She won the Miss Beautiful Hair and Miss Best of Kochi titles at the Miss South India beauty pageant contest held in 2001. Upon completion of her schooling at the St. George's Homes, a residential school in Ooty, she began her film career.

Pranathi made her acting debut alongside Bharath in Jayaraj's successful Malayalam film 4 the People (2004). In 2005, during the making of Gurudeva and Kaatru Ullavarai alongside actor Jai Akash, reports suggested that the pair were dating. Also during 2005, her most prolific year, she appeared in a Kannada film titled Santosha as well as in the Sathyaraj-starrer Vanakkam Thalaiva.

She quit the film industry soon after failing to garner further offers.

Filmography

References

Living people
Actresses in Tamil cinema
Indian film actresses
1987 births
Actresses in Malayalam cinema
Actresses in Kannada cinema
21st-century Indian actresses
Actresses in Telugu cinema